Oghuz or Oğuz may refer to:

an early Turkic word for "tribe", see Oghuz (tribe)
 Oghuz languages, southwestern branch of the Turkic language family
 Oghuz Turks, the Turkic groups speaking Oghuz languages
 Oghuz Khan, a legendary and semi-mythological Turkic khan
 Oğuz (name), a Turkish masculine given name
 Oghuz Rayon, an administrative district of Azerbaijan
 Oghuz (city), a city, municipality and capital of Oghuz Rayon, Azerbaijan
 Oğuz, Buldan

See also
Oğuzhan (disambiguation)

Language and nationality disambiguation pages